Socialist Janata Dal or SJD is a party split from the Janata Dal (United) party. "Socialist Janata Dal" had an alliance with National Democratic Alliance (India) in Kerala and it also supported the NDA in the center. The leader of the party is V. V. Rajendran.State secretary general Adv. Johny k john.

Leaders  
State general secretary:S. Santhoshkumar,Vishnu V. Raj,B. T. Rema

State president: V. S. Rajlal

Alliance
The "Socialist Janata Dal" Party has been working with NDA since March 2014.

References

Political parties in India
Political parties established in 2014
2014 establishments in India